Maria Grazia Marchelli (1 June 1932 – 26 June 2006) was an Italian alpine skier. She competed at the 1952 Winter Olympics and the 1956 Winter Olympics.

She was the sister of the skier Carla Marchelli.

References

External links
 

1932 births
2006 deaths
Italian female alpine skiers
Olympic alpine skiers of Italy
Alpine skiers at the 1952 Winter Olympics
Alpine skiers at the 1956 Winter Olympics
Sportspeople from Genoa